Syarhey Pyatrovich Amelyanchuk (born 8 August 1980) is a Belarusian football coach and former player.

International career
Amelyanchuk has been capped for national team regularly since 2002 and is currently the third most-capped player of the team behind Aliaksandr Kulchiy and Sergei Gurenko.

International goal

Honours
Legia Warszawa
Ekstraklasa champion: 2001–02
Polish League Cup winner: 2001–02

Lokomotiv Moscow
Russian Super Cup winner: 2005

References

External links
 
 
 
 
 

1980 births
Living people
Sportspeople from Gomel
Belarusian footballers
Association football defenders
Belarus international footballers
Belarusian expatriate footballers
Expatriate footballers in Poland
Expatriate footballers in Russia
Expatriate footballers in Ukraine
Belarusian expatriate sportspeople in Ukraine
Belarusian expatriate sportspeople in Poland
Belarusian expatriate sportspeople in Russia
Belarusian Premier League players
Ekstraklasa players
Ukrainian Premier League players
Russian Premier League players
FC RUOR Minsk players
FC Torpedo Minsk players
Legia Warsaw players
FC Arsenal Kyiv players
FC Lokomotiv Moscow players
FC Shinnik Yaroslavl players
FC Rostov players
FC Akhmat Grozny players
FC Tom Tomsk players
FC Minsk players